In many countries, kilometre zero (also written km 0) or similar terms in other languages (also known as zero mile marker, zero milepost, control stations or control points) denote a particular location (usually in the nation's capital city) from which distances are traditionally measured, this is also used for measuring distances between different countries around the world. Historically, they were markers where drivers could set their odometers to follow the directions in early guide books.

One such marker is the Milliarium Aureum ("Golden Milestone") of the Roman Empire, believed to be the literal origin for the maxim that "all roads lead to Rome".

Countries

Argentina

Argentina marks kilometre zero with a monolith in Plaza Congreso in Buenos Aires. The work of the brothers Máximo and José Fioravanti, the structure was placed on the north side of Plaza Lorea on October 2, 1935; it was moved to its present location on May 18, 1944. An image of Our Lady of Luján (honored on the monolith as "the patron saint of the national road network") appears on the monolith's north face, a relief map of Argentina is on the south face, plaques in honor of José de San Martín are west, and on its eastern side, the date of the decree and the name of the relevant authorities.

Australia
Highways in Australia are usually built and maintained by the states and territories.

In the state of New South Wales, highway distances (mileages) were traditionally measured from a sandstone obelisk in Macquarie Place in Sydney, designed by Francis Greenway in 1818. The obelisk lists the distances to various locations in New South Wales at the time. For the railway, it is at platform 1 of Sydney Central Station.

The General Post Office building in Melbourne traditionally serves this purpose in Victoria.

In Western Australia, road distances are measured from point zero, which is by the old Treasury Building on the corner of Cathedral Avenue and St George's Terrace in Perth.

Canada

The kilometre zero marker of the eastern origin of the Trans-Canada Highway is in St. John's, Newfoundland.
Coordinates: 
Altitude: 14.02 m (46 ft)
The western terminus of the Trans-Canada Highway in Victoria, British Columbia, is on the southern end of Vancouver Island.
Mile zero of the Trans Canada Trail is adjacent to the Railway Coastal Museum in St. John's, Newfoundland.
Coordinates: 
Altitude: 
Mile zero for the Alaska Highway is in Dawson Creek, British Columbia.

Chile

All national distances from Santiago originate at the Km. 0 plaque, at the Plaza de Armas main square in downtown Santiago. (Coordinates: .)

Chile's Autopista Central – Eje Norte-Sur (the eastern segment of the Panamerican Highway that passes through Santiago) has its kilometre zero at the intersection with the Alameda del Libertador Bernardo O'Higgins, the capital's main avenue. (Coordinates: .)

China

China Railway's kilometre zero is at the entrance to the Fengtai Yard on the Jingguang Line just outside Beijing. This point was historically the start of the line; the marker is a simple concrete marker, with "0" painted on it. There is no ceremonial plaque.

The kilometre zero point for highways is at Tiananmen Square, just outside the Zhengyangmen Gate. It is marked with a plaque in the ground, with the four cardinal points, four animals, and "Zero Point of Highways, China" in English and Chinese.

Cuba

Cuba's kilometre zero is in its capital Havana in El Capitolio. Embedded in the floor in the centre of the main hall is a replica 25 carat (5 g) diamond, which marks kilometre zero. The original diamond, said to have belonged to Tsar Nicholas II of Russia and have been sold to the Cuban state by a Turkish merchant, was stolen on March 25, 1946, and mysteriously returned to the President, Ramón Grau San Martín, on June 2, 1946. It was replaced in El Capitolio by a replica in 1973.

Denmark
Traditionally distances to Copenhagen were measured to the old city gates. Copenhagen Town hall square (old Vesterport) is the zero point for roads from south and west such from Korsør or Rødby. For road from north such as from Helsingør or Hillerød, point zero is Østerport located on the North side of the inner city. On railways distances are in general measured from Copenhagen Central Station.

Dominican Republic
DR-1, DR-2, and DR-3 all depart from kilometre zero at Santo Domingo's Parque de Independencia.

Egypt

Kilometre zero in Egypt is at the Attaba Square Post Office in 1st of Abdel Khaliq Sarwat Pasha Street, Cairo.

Ethiopia
Kilometre zero in Ethiopia is in Menelik Square, Addis Ababa, in front of St. George's Cathedral; it is the point from which all Ethiopian highway distances are measured. The point was designated by Emperor Haile Selassie in 1930.

Finland

Kilometre zero in Finland is at the Erottaja square in central Helsinki.

France

Kilometre zero of the French national highways is in Paris, on the square facing the main entrance of Notre-Dame..

A commemorative kilometre zero for the Liberty Road was erected in Sainte-Mère-Eglise, liberated by U.S. paratroopers on 6 June 1944.

Germany

Initially, the origin point of all Prussian roads leading to and from Berlin was at Dönhoff-Platz in the city centre (1730–1875) and in 1975 a reconstructed milestone was placed in front of the Spittel-Kolonnaden at Marion-Gräfin-Dönhoff-Platz. (Coordinates: .)

Great Britain

On the pavement a few feet behind the equestrian statue of King Charles I that sits on a traffic island just south of Trafalgar Square in London, there is a plaque bearing the inscription:
On the site now occupied by the statue of King Charles I was erected the original Queen Eleanor's Cross, a replica of which stands in front of Charing Cross station. Mileages from London are measured from the site of the original cross.

In Scotland, distances from Edinburgh are measured from the GPO building in Princes Street.

For most mainline railways, miles are measured from the associated London terminal station.

The 0 km point for the whole London Underground network is located at Ongar railway station which is actually no longer part of the network and is only operated as part of a heritage railway.

See also:
 London Stone — possibly the Roman zero point
 Hicks Hall — traditionally the start of the Great North Road
 St Mary-le-Bow — the church traditionally the zero point of the road to Lewes in Sussex.

Greece
In ancient Greece, distances were measured from the altar of twelve gods, in the ancient agora of Athens. So, that altar can be considered the first kilometre zero in human history.

Nowadays, the kilometre zero for Greek highways is in Syntagma Square, the major square of Athens.

Guatemala

The kilometre zero is located at National Palace (Guatemala) in Guatemala City. The National Palace is also the residence for the Guatemalan president.

Hong Kong
Traditionally, milestones for Castle Peak Road, Tai Po Road and Clear Water Bay Road, the first three highways extending from the city centre in Kowloon to the rural areas, were all measured from the Star Ferry pier at Tsim Sha Tsui. There are still milestones preserved today but there is no Milestone 0.

However, modern highways no longer use this system. Each trunk route has its own km 0 at one end.

Hungary

The Zero Kilometre Stone in Budapest is marked by a monument, forming the number "zero". The starting point was initially reckoned from the threshold of the Buda Royal Palace, but it was taken down to the Széchenyi Chain Bridge when it was built in 1849.

The city of Kecskemét also has a zero kilometre stone, on Kossuth Square.

India
In India, the Zero Mile Stone is a monument in the city of Nagpur, Maharashtra. The Zero Mile Stone was erected by the British Raj, and consists of four horses and a pillar made of sandstone. There is no verifiable evidence that it is a monument locating the geographical centre of colonial India in the city of Nagpur, or that the Zero Mile Stone was erected by the British to use this point to measure all the distances. Incidentally, the city of Nagpur lies geographically center to all the four major metros of India, viz. Chennai, Mumbai, Kolkata and New Delhi.

In Mumbai, the zero point used to be at St. Thomas Cathedral, but now it is at the Horniman Circle. In Chennai, kilometre zero is at the midpoint of Muthuswamy Bridge on Muthuswamy Road near the Chennai Fort railway station on the south-western side of the Fort St. George.

Indonesia
Kilometre zero of Indonesia is marked by the monument in Weh Island in Aceh, the northernmost and westernmost point of Indonesia.

Iran
In Iran, the Azadi Tower in Tehran serves as the kilometre zero.

Ireland

In Ireland distances from Dublin are measured from the General Post Office on the city's main thoroughfare, O'Connell Street.

Israel
In Jerusalem, its kilometre zero or zero point is at Jaffa Gate. Some say it's at The Garden Tomb. However, there is no precise marker, as of today.

Italy
The Italian kilometre zero is on the top of the Capitoline Hill, in Rome.

Japan

 is on the middle of Nihonbashi bridge in Tokyo. Tokyo Station is considered the originating point of the national railway network and has several posts and monuments indicating kilometre zero for lines originating from the station.

Madagascar
Kilometre zero for the major roads radiating from Antananarivo is on the square in front of the Soarano Railway Station.

Malaysia

Kilometre zero for roads and highways in Peninsular Malaysia is located in front of Johor Bahru General Post Office. It is one of the rare cases where the national kilometre zero is not at the capital (in this case, Kuala Lumpur) due to the fact that the distances for three major backbone routes (Federal Routes 1, 3 and 5) are measured from Johor Bahru, where the three routes meet.

Mexico
Kilometre zero is in Mexico City, next to the Mexico City Metropolitan Cathedral.

North Korea
The North Korean kilometre zero is at Kim Il-sung Square in the capital Pyongyang.

Norway
Kilometre zero for roads from Oslo is at the address Observatoriegaten 1. Kilometre zero for most railways in Norway is 0,27 km westwards into the Oslo Tunnel.

Panama
The Panamanian kilometre zero is at the Martin Sosa Bridge on the Simon Bolivar Avenue (Transisthmian Highway) in Panama City.

Pakistan
The Pakistani zero point is found in Islamabad, the capital of Pakistan. It is the busiest interchange of Islamabad.

Philippines

The Rizal Monument of Rizal Park in Manila serves as kilometer zero for the island of Luzon; it also serves as point of reference, via the Pan-Philippine Highway, for the islands of Samar, Leyte, and Mindanao, although Mindanao has its own kilometer zero marker at Marawi. For all other island provinces, the front of provincial capitols buildings serves as kilometer zero.

Prior to World War II, the entire archipelago only had one kilometre zero. It was situated on the cross atop the media naranja dome crossing of the seventh incarnation of Manila Cathedral.

Poland

Warsaw, the capital of Poland, has a meeting point featuring plaques with distances from it to other major cities of the country. It is placed on the intersection of the city's two main avenues, Aleje Jerozolimskie and Marszałkowska Street, next to the Centrum Warsaw Metro station.

Portugal
Portugal does not have a physical kilometre zero marker, but distances in origin-destinations matrices involving Lisbon use the Rossio square in the country's capital as kilometre zero.

Romania

Romania's kilometre zero is marked by a monument next to Saint George's Church in Bucharest, which was built in 1938.

The distances from Bucharest to other cities in Romania are measured from this monument. It is divided into eight sections, each representing a Romanian historical province: Muntenia, Dobruja, Bessarabia, Moldavia, Bukovina, Transylvania, Banat, and Oltenia. Among the cities inscribed on it are also Cahul, Chișinău, Orhei, and Tighina(which are currently in the Republic of Moldova), Cernăuți, Cetatea Albă, Ismail, and Storojineț(now in Ukraine), as well as Bazargic and Silistra(now in Bulgaria), which were part of Greater Romania before World War II.

Russia

The bronze plaque marking Russia's kilometre zero is in Moscow, just in front of the Iberian Chapel, in a short passage connecting Red Square with Manege Square and flanked by the State Historical Museum and the City Duma.

Slovakia
Slovakia has its kilometre zero in Bratislava under Michael's Gate in the Michalská veža (St. Michael's tower).

South Korea
Seoul, the capital city of South Korea, has its doro wonpyo (Korean: 도로원표) in the centre of Gwanghwamun Intersection to measure the distances of both national and regional roads. The initial statue, erected in 1997, is near the Donghwa duty-free shop building, next to a police station, and in front of the Shinhan Bank building (Gwanghwamun Station), 151 metres from its exact point.

Spain

Spain has its kilometre zero at the Puerta del Sol in Madrid, in front of the Royal House of the Post Office.
A plaque on the ground marks the official time in Spain, according to an urban legend. The plaque that marks this point was rotated 180 degrees by mistake in 2002 during a renovation of the square.  This was corrected in 2009. The clock of the Post Office building marks the official time for Madrid, synchronized with Spanish ROA Time.

Sri Lanka
In Sri Lanka, all distances from Colombo are measured in kilometres (formerly in miles) from the Fort Clock Tower near President's House. This practice began with the construction of the Colombo-Kandy road in 1830, which was the first modern highway in the island. Since then three major roads have been constructed in Colombo; A1 – Colombo-Kandy Road, A2 – Colombo-Wellawaya (CGHW) Road and A4 – Colombo-Batticaloa (CRWB) Road.

Sweden 
In Sweden, the equestrian statue of King Gustav II Adolf in the middle of the Gustav Adolfs torg square in Stockholm is used as kilometre zero for roads. In general road distance signs are measured to city midpoints. For most mainline railways, kilometres are measured from the entrance door from the main hall to track 10 of the Stockholm Central Station. There are simple painted signs on the side of the platforms.

Switzerland
The federal railway network's Kilometre Null is in Olten. It was made in the 19th century to mark the point from where the Swiss railway system was measured. Because of the complex and dense manner in which the Swiss railway system has since grown, and continues to grow, it is no longer used. There is a mark at Zürich Main Station which is a little outside the present end of the tracks and used by some mainlines.

Taiwan (Republic of China)

The crossroad of Zhongxiao Road and Zhongshan Road (Taipei) in Zhongzheng District, Taipei is the start point of provincial highway No. 1, 1A, 3, 5 and 9. In 2012, by the Directorate General of Highways, MOTC, a traffic sign and a sidewalk inscription marking the location as kilometre zero were placed by the northeast side and by the southeast side of the intersection separately.

Thailand

Thailand has two points declared as kilometre zero. The National Highway's kilometre zero is the Democracy Monument on Ratchadamnoen Avenue, and the railway's kilometre zero is the Erawan Elephant Monument, in front of Bangkok railway station.

Ukraine
Kilometre zero for Ukraine, called "The Winged Globe", is at Maidan Nezalezhnosti in Kyiv. (Coordinates: .)

United Kingdom
See § Great Britain

United States

The metric system is not the common system in the United States, but mile markers for most major roads begin at either their western or southern terminus. The mile-marking systems are generally within individual states; the mile count starts over when a state boundary is crossed.

Although not used for measurement on U.S. roads outside the city of Washington, D.C., a Zero Milestone near the White House was proposed in 1919 and a permanent marker placed in 1923 by the federal government, funded by the Good Roads Movement. However, the Capitol building is used as the zero point for the city including the nation.

In New York City, Columbus Circle, at the southwest corner of Central Park, is the traditional point from which all official distances are measured, although Google Maps uses New York City Hall for the purpose. Others consider Times Square as a marker.

In the City of Chicago and some of its suburbs, the intersection of State and Madison is the defined zero point.

In Los Angeles, the intersection of Main Street and 1st Street is the defined zero point. Hollywood's own zero point is at the intersection of Hollywood Boulevard and Highland Avenue.

Perhaps the most well-known 'Mile Zero' in the US, and the one that has spawned the creation of a popular bumper sticker, is in Key West, Florida, at the southern terminus of U.S. Route 1.

Uruguay

Uruguay has a "Kilómetro Cero" for the national routes at the Monument to Peace, in Plaza de Cagancha of the city of Montevideo.

A "Kilómetro Cero" has been established for the Uruguay River by the Treaty of Río Uruguay in 1961 on the parallel passing the area, Punta Gorda in the Colonia Department, south of Nueva Palmira.

Historical

Byzantine Empire

The Byzantine Empire had an arched building, the Milion of Constantinople, as the starting-place for the measurement of distances for all the roads leading to the other cities.
In the 1960s, some fragments were discovered and erected in its original location, now in the district of Eminönü, Istanbul, Turkey.

See also
:Category:Geodetic datums
Milliarium Aureum
Zero Milestone
London Stone
Datum (geodesy)
Milestone
Confluence point

References

ro:Poștă#Kilometrul zero